Yang Chao may refer to:

Yang Chao (figure skater) 
Yang Chao (handballer)
Yang Chao (footballer) 
Yang Chao (sport shooter)